Kerteh Airport  is an airport in Kerteh, Kemaman District, Terengganu in Malaysia.

The airport is owned by Petroleum Nasional Berhad or Petronas via its East Coast Regional Office (ECRO), and was built to serve the purpose of airlifting its employees and ExxonMobil employees to their various oil platforms located 100–200 km offshore South China Sea. The airport is operated by Senai Airport Terminal Services Sdn Bhd which is the operator of Senai International Airport since 2019.

Most of the airport's operations are centred on the helicopters operated by Malaysia Helicopter Services (MHS) used to transport workers to the platforms. The airport also used to have a weekday fixed-wing chartered service using a Beechcraft 1900 Airliner turboprop aircraft, also operated by MHS, which shuttles Petronas and ExxonMobil employees from Kerteh to the Sultan Abdul Aziz Shah Airport (SZB) in Subang near Kuala Lumpur.

References

External links
 

Airports in Terengganu
Kemaman District